Naman Shaw is an Indian television actor notable for his roles as Pushkar Shukla in Zee TV's drama series Kasamh Se, as Nakul Virani in STAR Plus's series Kyunki Saas Bhi Kabhi Bahu Thi and in Kasautii Zindagii Kay as Nihaal Garewal. Naman Shaw has also played small roles in other serials such as a brief role in Kasturi as Kasturi's fiancé, Girish. Later he had a brief role in Kahe Naa Kahe as Vidhyud on 9X channel.

Shaw began his acting career through participating in Zee TV's talent hunt show, India's Best Cinestars Ki Khoj in 2004 where he made the Top 15. He also appeared in Nach Baliye 4. He was seen in Colors TV's popular show Kairee — Rishta Khatta Meetha as Anuj replacing Jay Bhanushali., He has worked in web series FLIP (Anthology- HUNT ) directed by Bejoy Nambiar. He has produced numerous shows / Webseries.

Television

Web

References

External links
 

Living people
Year of birth missing (living people)
Indian male television actors
Indian male models
21st-century Indian male actors